Great Wife, otherwise appearing in West Africa as Senior Wife, is an honorific applied to contemporary royal and aristocratic consorts in states throughout modern Africa (e.g., Mantfombi Dlamini of eSwatini, who once served as the chief consort of a Zulu King).

History

In ancient Egypt, the pharaoh's principal consort was known as the great royal wife. She presided over her husband's harem, and served a variety of priestly functions in the kingdom.

In Kush and the other African states of the pre-colonial period, the chief royal consorts often functioned in much the same fashion.

Today

The practice of creating great wives, with the most senior polygynous spouses of contemporary African royals and aristocrats often being referred to as their Great Wives, has continued to the present. In addition to the queen of the Zulus, contemporary holders of the title have included the numerous bearers of the Olori Agba attribute of Yorubaland and the principal consort of the Ingwenyama of Eswatini.

List

See also
Queen mothers (Africa)
Great Royal Wife

References

Royal consorts
African culture